Sports in South Central Pennsylvania are a long-held tradition and culture, such as the professional baseball teams who "barnstormed" their way through Lancaster County's farmland in the early 1900s, to Milton S. Hershey's creation of the Hershey B'ars hockey club in 1932, to canoe races held on the Susquehanna River each summer during Kipona in Harrisburg. Listed below are some sports teams that are currently based in the region:

Baseball

Three professional baseball teams compete in the South Central Pennsylvania area:  the Harrisburg Senators, the Lancaster Barnstormers, and the York Revolution.  The Senators are the oldest team of the three, with the current incarnation playing since 1987.  The Barnstormers joined the Atlantic League of Professional Baseball in the 2005 season, and won the Championship Series in 2006.  Following the success of Lancaster's entry, the Opening Day Partners ownership group added the York Revolution in 2007.

The three cities of Harrisburg, Lancaster, and York each had various baseball plans before settling with their current situations. In 1867, Harrisburg hosted a conference held by the Philadelphia 'Base Ball' Association which became the first baseball league to officially segregate its players. Baseball in Harrisburg on City Island went back to the 1880s with amateur games, and in 1903 the professional Harrisburg Athletics and Negro league Harrisburg Giants came to the island. The Harrisburg Giants played on City Island through 1957, and in 1954 were the first Negro league team to integrate white players as they switched to a Minor League team.

The original Harrisburg Senators played in the Eastern League in 1924.  Playing its home games at Island Field, the team won the league championship in the 1927, 1928, and 1931 seasons.  The Senators played a few more seasons before flood waters destroyed Island Field in 1936, effectively ending Eastern League participation for fifty-one years.  In 1940, Harrisburg gained an Interstate League team affiliated with the Pittsburgh Pirates.  However, the team remained in the city only until 1943, when it moved to nearby York and renamed the York Pirates.  The current Harrisburg Senators won the Eastern League championship in the 1987, 1993, 1996, 1997, 1998, and 1999 seasons.

Many decades before the formation of the Barnstormers and Revolution organizations, the cities of Lancaster and York battled for baseball supremacy in the "War of the Roses."  The Lancaster Red Roses and the York White Roses both played in various leagues together, with some bitter rivalry.  Both teams were eventually dissolved, leaving Lancaster and York without baseball for several decades.

The Lancaster Barnstormers arrived in 2005, the first baseball team in the city for 44 years.  The Barnstormers won the Atlantic League Championship Series in 2006, defeating the Bridgeport Bluefish in the league's first four-game sweep in a championship.  The York Revolution played its inaugural season in 2007, reigniting the "War of the Roses" rivalry with Lancaster.  The Barnstormers and the Revolution both wear retro uniforms of the respective Red Roses and White Roses for some of the games played between them.

Baseball players
Many professional baseball players call the South Central Pennsylvania region home, such as Lancaster native Tom Herr.  Herr is a former Major League second baseman who played for the St. Louis Cardinals, the Minnesota Twins, the Philadelphia Phillies, the San Francisco Giants, and the New York Mets.  After his retirement from Major League Baseball, Herr coached the Hempfield High School baseball team, a stint which included mentoring his son, Aaron.  In 2005, he accepted the field manager position with his hometown Lancaster Barnstormers, leading them to win the 2006 Atlantic League Championship Series.  This victory drew the attention of the Washington Nationals, who ultimately signed Herr to manage their AA team in Hagerstown, Maryland.

Tom Herr's son, Aaron, was drafted in 2000 by the Atlanta Braves and assigned to the rookie-level Gulf Coast Braves.  He remained in the Braves organization until the 2006 season, when Herr signed with the Cincinnati Reds.  The Reds initially assigned him to the A-level Chattanooga Lookouts, but worked his way up to the AAA-level Louisville Bats.  Aaron's brother, Jordan, played for his hometown Lancaster Barnstormers in the latter part of their 2008 season in lieu of completing his senior year at the University of Pittsburgh.  Jordan was signed by the Chicago White Sox and allocated to their minor league system following the Barnstormers' 2008 season.

Lancaster County is also the home of other Major League Baseball veterans like Gene Garber, John Parrish, and Bruce Sutter.  Gene Garber is noted for ending Pete Rose's 44-game consecutive hitting streak, and ranks fifth in career pitching appearances.  With 25 saves, Garber ranks second to John Smoltz on the Atlanta Braves all-time save list.  John Parrish, an alumnus of J.P. McCaskey High School, is a relief pitcher for the Toronto Blue Jays.  Bruce Sutter, notable for the popularization of the split-finger fastball, was inducted into the Baseball Hall of Fame in 2006.  Sutter has many other awards including a Cy Young Award, a Babe Ruth Award, four Rolaids Relief Man of the Year Awards, and six National League All-Star selections.
Travis Jankowski (Lancaster Catholic HS) went on to be drafted by the San Diego Padres. He made his MLB debut during the 2016 season and was on the opening day roster for the 2017 season.

Golf

Professional golf is well represented by Manheim Township High School alumnus, Jim Furyk.  He placed 4th in the 1998 and 2003 Masters Tournament, won the 2003 U.S. Open, placed 4th in the 1997, 1998, and 2006 British Open, and placed 6th in the 1997 PGA Championship.  Furyk also won the Vardon Trophy in 2006.

The 2015 U.S. Women's Open was held at the Lancaster Country Club.

Ice hockey
The Hershey Bears, owned by The Hershey Company, represent the entire South Central Pennsylvania region.  Started in 1932, the Bears are the oldest member of the American Hockey League, the AAA-level of the North American ice hockey organizational structure.  The team is an eleven-time Calder Cup champion, most recently in the 2009–2010 season.

The city of York hosted the IceCats of the North Eastern Hockey League in the 2003–2004 season.  The team played at the York City Ice Arena, but moved to St. Catharines, Ontario in 2005.  The now defunct Mid-Atlantic Hockey League initially showed interest in placing a team in York, but those efforts never came into fruition.

The Central Penn Panthers of the junior-level Eastern Hockey League (2013–) play in the city of Lancaster.

Lancaster Classic
Lancaster is home to the Lancaster Classic, a professional road bicycle racing event held each June since 1992.  The Classic is part of the 2006-2007 UCI America Tour and the 2007 USA Cycling Professional Tour.

Soccer
Soccer is widely played in the South Central Pennsylvania region, and hosts three outdoor professional teams: Hershey FC, Pennsylvania Classics AC, and Lancaster Inferno FC. Penn FC formerly played at FNB Field, located on Harrisburg's City Island. Harrisburg also has an indoor soccer team called the Harrisburg Heat that plays their home games at New Holland Arena and participates in the Major Arena Soccer League. International soccer star Christian Pulisic is from Hershey. The Hershey Wildcats represented the area between 1997 and 2001.

Field Hockey
In 2013, USA Field Hockey announced their intentions to move its national training center for the United States women's national field hockey team to Lancaster County. The team signed with Spooky Nook Sports, but announced in a joint statement in 2020 that they would be relocating after issues with the outdoor pitch.

Swimming
South Central Pennsylvania produced such Olympic swimmers as Anita Nall and Jeremy Linn of Harrisburg, Leah Gingrich of Enola, Josef Kinderwater of Lancaster, Tricia Weaner of Gettysburg, Whitney Metzler of Dallastown and Katie Nolan of Hershey.

References

Sports in Harrisburg, Pennsylvania
Sports in Lancaster, Pennsylvania
Sports in York, Pennsylvania
South Central